Júlio Santos (born 30 May 1936) is a Portuguese former athlete. He competed in the men's decathlon at the 1960 Summer Olympics.

References

External links
 

1936 births
Living people
Athletes (track and field) at the 1960 Summer Olympics
Portuguese decathletes
Olympic athletes of Portugal
Sportspeople from Cascais